We'll Live Till Monday (translit. Dozhivyom do ponedelnika) is a 1968 Soviet drama film directed by Stanislav Rostotsky. It was entered into the 6th Moscow International Film Festival where it won the Golden Prize. The film is about the life of an ordinary Moscow school with all its joys, problems and difficult choices in their lives of students and teachers.

Plot
History teacher Ilya Melnikov is familiar with both doubts and feelings of dissatisfaction. Though he is not always right, he fights, loves, and overcomes difficulties and doubts.

Cast
 Vyacheslav Tikhonov as Ilya Semyonovich Melnikov —  History Teacher
 Irina Pechernikova as Natalya Sergeevna Gorelova —  English Language Teacher, former Melnikov's student
 Nina Menshikova as Svetlana Mikhailovna —  Russian Language and Literature Teacher
 Mikhail Zimin as Nikolai Borisovich —  School Principal
 Nadir Malishevsky as TV Show Host
 Dalvin Shcherbakov as Borya Rudnitsky, former Melnikov's student
 Olga Zhiznyeva as Melnikov's Mother
 Lyudmila Arkharova as Nadya Ogarysheva, pupil
 Valeriy Zubarev as Genka Shestopal, pupil
 Olga Ostroumova as Rita Cherkasova, pupil
 Igor Starygin as Kostya Batishchev, pupil
 Roza Grigoryeva as Sveta Demidova, pupil
 Yuri Chernov as Syromyatnikov, pupil
 Lyubov Sokolova as Levikova
 Arkadi Listarov as Vova Levikov, pupil

Awards 
 Soviet Screen Magazine Best 1968 film
 Golden Prize of 6th Moscow International Film Festival, 1969
 USSR State Prize, 1970

References

External links
 

1968 films
1968 drama films
Soviet drama films
Russian drama films
1960s Russian-language films
Films directed by Stanislav Rostotsky
Films set in schools
Films set in the Soviet Union
Films shot in Moscow
Gorky Film Studio films
Soviet teen films